Bombers Fly East is a 1943 semi-autobiographical novel written by the author Bruce Sanders. The novel tells the story of the struggles, defeats and successes of the airmen in the RAF Bomber Command.

The novel is of great historical significance for two reasons - firstly that the first-edition of the book was published during the war itself - secondly that the first-edition contained ground-breaking historical photography that accompanied the text. First-editions are relatively rare.

Notes

References 

Memoirs
World War II